The Serpent's Way is a 1986 Swedish drama film directed by Bo Widerberg. It is based on the novel The Way of a Serpent by Torgny Lindgren. The film was screened in the Un Certain Regard section at the 1987 Cannes Film Festival and in competition at the 15th Moscow International Film Festival. At the 22nd Guldbagge Awards Stina Ekblad won the award for Best Actress.

Cast
 Stina Ekblad as Tea Alexisdotter
 Stellan Skarsgård as Karl Orsa Markström
 Reine Brynolfsson as Jani
 Pernilla August as Eva (as Pernilla Östergren)
 Tomas von Brömssen as Jacob
 Pernilla Wahlgren as Johanna
 Ernst Günther as Ol Karlsa
 Birgitta Ulfsson as Grandma
 Johan Widerberg as Jani as a child
 Melinda Kinnaman as Eva as child

References

External links

1986 films
1986 drama films
Swedish drama films
1980s Swedish-language films
Films directed by Bo Widerberg
1980s Swedish films